Peter William Krause (born August 12, 1965) is an American actor, director, and producer. He has played lead roles in multiple television series, portraying Casey McCall on Sports Night (1998–2000), Nate Fisher on Six Feet Under (2001–2005), Nick George on Dirty Sexy Money (2007–2009), Adam Braverman on Parenthood (2010–2015), Benjamin Jones on The Catch (2016–2017), and Bobby Nash on 9-1-1 (2018–present).

For his work on Six Feet Under, Krause was nominated for three Primetime Emmy Awards, two Golden Globe Awards, and seven Screen Actors Guild Awards, winning twice for Outstanding Performance by an Ensemble in a Drama Series.

Early life
Krause was born on August 12, 1965, in Alexandria, Minnesota. His parents, Wanda Marie Krause (née Johnson) and William Popham "Bill" Krause, were both teachers in Minnesota. He was raised in Roseville, Minnesota, a suburb of St. Paul, and has two siblings, Amy and Michael.

As a teenager, Krause was active in track and field and gymnastics and attended Alexander Ramsey High School in Roseville, Minnesota. He graduated from high school in 1983 and was a pre-medical student at Gustavus Adolphus College in St. Peter until he discovered acting in his junior year and changed his final major to English Literature. In college, he performed in plays such as Paul Sills' Story Theatre, Caryl Churchill's Cloud 9, and Harold Pinter's The Dumb Waiter, which all led to his full commitment to acting. After graduating from college in 1987, Krause moved to New York City and completed a Master of Fine Arts degree in acting from New York University's Graduate Acting Program at the Tisch School of the Arts in 1990. While in New York City, he worked as a bartender at Broadway's Palace Theatre with Aaron Sorkin, who later created and executive produced Sports Night, which starred Krause.

While attending Tisch School of the Arts, he starred in productions of Macbeth, Uncle Vanya, and Arms and the Man. Shortly after graduation, Krause moved to Los Angeles after landing a regular role on Carol Burnett's sketch comedy series Carol & Company.

Career
In 1987, Krause made his first feature film appearance in an American slasher film, Blood Harvest. After earning an M.F.A. degree from the New York University Tisch School of the Arts in 1990, he moved to Los Angeles and made his first television appearance, playing various roles in Carol Burnett's comedy anthology series Carol & Company from 1990 to 1991. In the early 1990s, he appeared in TV shows such as Seinfeld, Beverly Hills, 90210 and Ellen. Starting in 1996, Krause appeared in a recurring role as Cybill Shepherd's son-in-law Kevin on her sitcom Cybill for four seasons.

From 1998 to 2000, Krause also portrayed the character Casey McCall on the ABC network's comedy Sports Night. Although the show received considerable critical acclaim, it struggled to find an audience and was canceled after two seasons.

Krause starred in the HBO drama series Six Feet Under from 2001 to 2005. He received seven award nominations (including three Emmy nominations) for his portrayal of funeral director Nate Fisher.

Krause appeared on Broadway in the summer of 2004 in a revival of Arthur Miller's After the Fall.

In December 2006, he played the lead role, Detective Joe Miller, in the Sci Fi Channel miniseries The Lost Room.

From 2007 to 2009, Krause portrayed young lawyer Nick George in ABC's drama Dirty Sexy Money alongside veteran actor Donald Sutherland. He had initially turned down the role three times. He also served as a series producer. From 2010 to 2015, he played Adam Braverman in the NBC comedy-drama Parenthood. He directed three episodes for the show. Krause appeared in the 2011 fantasy film Beastly, based on Alex Flinn's 2007 novel of the same name. From 2016 to 2017, he starred opposite Mireille Enos in the ABC crime drama series The Catch, produced by Shonda Rhimes.

In August 2017, Krause was cast in the Ryan Murphy-produced drama 9-1-1, which focuses on the lives of first responders. He plays a fire captain named Bobby Nash and is an executive producer of the series. He is the narrator of Citizen Hearst, an Insignia Films documentary about William Randolph Hearst which originally aired as an American Experience two-part series on September 27 and 28, 2021.

Personal life

Krause and his former girlfriend Christine King have a son, Roman, who was born in 2001. In 2010, Krause entered a relationship with actress Lauren Graham. They first met in 1995 when they both appeared in the sitcom Caroline in the City, then became a couple while co-starring on Parenthood. In June 2022, it was reported that the couple had ended their relationship in 2021 after 11 years together.

Filmography

Film

Television

Theatre

As director

As producer

Awards and nominations

References

External links

 

1965 births
Living people
20th-century American male actors
21st-century American male actors
American male television actors
American male film actors
American male stage actors
Gustavus Adolphus College alumni
Male actors from Minnesota
American television directors
American television producers
Television producers from Minnesota
People from Alexandria, Minnesota
People from Roseville, Minnesota
Tisch School of the Arts alumni